The Washington State Guard is the state defense force of the U.S. state of Washington. It is an element of the state's military forces which also include the Washington Army National Guard and the Washington Air National Guard.

History

Background

In early 1855, on the eve of the Yakima War, the legislature of Washington Territory authorized the creation of the Washington Territorial Volunteers (WTV), the first militia raised in what would become the state of Washington. The defeat of the U.S. Army that year at the Battle of Toppenish Creek sparked panic throughout the territory that an Indian uprising was in progress; hastily organized WTV companies elected their own officers and quickly put to the field with little in the way of arms or provisions. Over the course of the conflict, one half of all adult men in the territory would render military service.

In 1903, with the passage of the Dicks Act, the Washington militia – and, with it, the militias of the other states – were standardized as the National Guard and became part of the reserve forces of the United States, "the first step towards the eventual federalization of the traditional organized militia".

Establishment and early history
In the early 20th century Washington saw increasing levels of civil unrest, occasioned in part by the growing influence of the Industrial Workers of the World in the state. Disturbances in Spokane in 1917 prompted Governor Ernest Lister to declare martial law and order a major deployment of National Guard troops into the city. With the potential of U.S. entry into World War I, Lister resolved that a fallback military force would need to be raised to guard against insurrection while the Washington National Guard was in federal service. Contingency plans for such a force had already been drawn-up by the state's military department and Governor Lister authorized its creation on July 11, 1917. Sixteen infantry companies were organized into what was designated the Third Provisional Regiment and the Washington State Guard became operational on November 15, 1917. With the end of World War I came the disbandment of the State Guard.

In January 1941 the Washington National Guard was mobilized into federal service and the Washington State Guard reestablished to assume responsibility for state military missions. Not long after, however, it was determined by state officials that the increased probability of U.S. entry into World War II carried with it a heightened threat of invasion and the new force would need to be reorganized to defend the state's territory rather than simply fulfill civil assistance missions. Recruiting was suspended and the entirety of the force was organized into the State Guard Reserve, which was simply a roster of individual personnel. In June, soldiers of the State Guard Reserve began to be reconstituted into a formed force with the activation of the Fourth Washington Volunteer Infantry Regiment. As of December the regiment was fully trained and equipped and, by early 1942, the size of the State Guard had increased to just over 4,000 soldiers and officers with the force reorganized into two brigades. The bulk of the force spent the rest of 1942 conducting weekly drills to repel an anticipated Japanese invasion of Washington, while a smaller contingent of 30 personnel were activated to full-time status to man nine observation posts on the Olympic Peninsula. The State Guard, during this time, was primarily composed of older men, however, in 1944 the state began actively recruiting younger males with the idea that it could provide a potential source of post-war manpower for the returned National Guard.

During World War II, Washington's unusually large State Guard – relative to those maintained by other states – "reflected its insecurities over its exposed location". In 1947, with the end of World War II, the State Guard was, once more, disbanded.

Cold War

In 1950, three years after the dissolution of the Washington State Guard, provisions of federal law which permitted states to raise military forces separate from their National Guards expired. A 1953 legal opinion penned by the Attorney-General of Washington concluded that "there is no provision in the National Defense Act for the organization or maintenance of military forces, other than the National Guard, within the state. The organization of the state guard reserve at this time would not be authorized". In 1958, however, an amendment to the U.S. Code provided that "in addition to its National Guard, if any, a State, the Commonwealth of Puerto Rico, the District of Columbia, Guam, or the Virgin Islands may, as provided by its laws, organize and maintain defense forces".

The returned ability of states to raise a military separate from the National Guard saw Washington "at the forefront" of a small number of states that quickly moved to resurrect their forces, a callback to Washington's decision two decades before to outfit an unusually large and robust State Guard. On May 19, 1960, Governor Albert Rosellini issued an executive order commanding that "the Washington State Guard Reserve is established as a part of the organized militia of the State ... [to] function as an additional internal security force within the State for employment, in event of an emergency declared by the Governor, to augment the National Guard in protecting life and property; preserving order and public safety; and taking preventive action against threats to the internal security of the State".

Creation of the Washington State Guard Reserve came at the instigation of adjutant-general Gen. George Haskett due to concern the entire National Guard might be deployed outside the state in the event of war with the Soviet Union. It soon recruited 112 former U.S. Army and Washington National Guard officers; the force was conceived of and organized as a command nucleus around which a larger element could be rapidly raised in the event of a crisis. It was formed into a skeleton headquarters detachment and five cadre-staffed internal security battalions which, if brought to full strength, would fulfill public order and civil defense missions. By the 1970s it had grown to 164 officers, added an eight-man air section posted to the King County International Airport, and was officially renamed the Washington State Guard.

Organization

The Washington State Guard consists of two brigades. The First Infantry Brigade is located at the Seattle Armory and maintains two battalions in Olympia and Everett. The Second Infantry Brigade is located in Spokane. The WSG HQ is located at Camp Murray in Tacoma, Washington. State Guard soldiers drill in a non-pay status one day a month and two days during the summer. However, WSG soldiers can and have been called up to paid state active duty to support the Washington Military Department in a variety of missions within the state. They have been deployed to the State Emergency Operations Center and many county emergency operations centers to coordinate National Guard resource requests to state or federally declared disasters. State Guard members may resign their enlistment or commission at any time, unless mobilized or in paid state active duty status. Most WSG soldiers have served in the military, but some come straight from civilian life.

Despite the terms (e.g. "brigade" and "battalion") used for the units comprising the State Guard, actual personnel strength is cadre only, meaning that while a skeleton organization exists, for real-world deployment the organization would have to be filled by the "calling out" of the unorganized militia of the state by the Governor.

Personnel
As of 2016 the Washington State Guard had 80 personnel. Officers and enlisted personnel serve on a voluntary basis without pay, unless mobilized by the Governor of Washington, at which time they are paid at the same rate an equivalent rank in the National Guard would be paid. State Guard personnel, however, are eligible for free hunting licenses in Washington.

Legal basis

Article X of the Washington State Constitution authorizes the Washington State Legislature to create a militia and empowers the Governor of Washington with the authority to commission its officers, while Article III of the constitution places the governor as "commander-in-chief of the military in the state except when they shall be called into the service of the United States".

The legal status of the State Guard, specifically, is laid-out in Title 38 of the Revised Code of Washington (RCW) which establishes that the "militia of the state of Washington shall consist of ... all persons who are members of the national guard and the state guard."

As a component of the militia, the State Guard is under the ultimate authority of the governor in his role as commander-in-chief of Washington's armed forces. Chapter eight, section 100 of Title 38 sets-out that the governor may "send militia of this state into areas of any bordering state adjacent to the common boundary as may be necessary to provide effective protection" while section 60 establishes that "whenever any portion of the militia is ordered to duty by the governor, the decision of the governor shall be final, incontrovertible, and unimpeachable".

See also
 Washington Naval Militia
 Washington Wing Civil Air Patrol

Notes

References

External links
Washington State Guard Official site.

Government of Washington (state)
Military in Washington (state)
State defense forces of the United States